Sepanta International is a worldwide oil and natural gas extraction and drilling company. Principal extraction activities are in Iran, the United Arab Emirates, China, Belgium and Canada. In addition, Sepanta also operates other businesses that market and develop oil rig and drilling technologies. Sepanta's headquarters are currently located in Tehran, Iran.

Operations
Sepata was established in Ahvaz, Iran, located on 28,000 m² of the Azadegan Oil Field.

In 2008, Sepanta signed a cooperation agreement with Belorussian firm Belorusneft, becoming the third Iranian oil and gas corporation to be active in the nation.

See also
Energy in Iran
Ministry of Petroleum (Iran)

References

External links
company website

Oil and gas companies of Iran
Oilfield services companies
Iranian entities subject to the U.S. Department of the Treasury sanctions